The siege of Bangalore was a siege of the town and fortifications of Bangalore during the Third Anglo-Mysore War by forces of the British East India Company, led by Charles, Earl Cornwallis against a Mysorean garrison, while Tipu Sultan, Mysore's ruler, harried the camps and positions of the besiegers.  Arriving before the town on 5 February 1791, Cornwallis captured the town by assault on 7 February, and after six weeks of siege, stormed the fortress on 21 March.

Background 
The Bangalore fort was described as follows, in about 1791:

The siege 
Tipu Sultan followed Cornwallis' army, placing him in the awkward position of having an undefeated enemy army at his back while besieging the a strong fortification. Tipu kept away hoping to take assault when underway in flank. Over the next twelve days, two companies of the Madras Pioneers provided sappers for eight batteries, dug several parallels and a trench up to the fort ditch. Captain Kyd, of the Bengal Engineers then managed to breech the walls with mortars, and Cornwallis elected to attack secretly on the night of 21 March 1791. The Madras Pioneers, led by Lieutenant Colin Mackenzie, crossed the ditch with scaling ladders, mounted the breach and entered the fort, while the artillery engaged the fort with blank ammunition. With a breach made, the main stormers rushed in and the fort was captured after a hand-to hand fight in which a thousand defenders were killed. Cornwallis captured the fort and secured the force against Tipu.

The Madras Pioneers, went on to make Bangalore their permanent home.

According to the British chronicler Mark Wilks, the British faced respectable resistance. However, the resistance lasted a few hours, and the fort fell to the British. Loss of the Bangalore Fort resulted in severe loss of morale amongst Tippu's soldiers.

The British occupied the Bangalore Fort only for a year, as it was returned to Tippu Sultan, following the defeat of Tippu Sultan in 1792 and the consequent Treaty of Seringapatam. However, after the fall of Tippu Sultan in 1799, the Bangalore Fort came under British control. A British garrison was stationed at the fort till 1888, when it was handed over to the civil authorities.

Today, very little remains to remind people of the battle, except for a plaque (see picture), which reads "Through this breach the British assault was delivered. 21 March 1791."

Fort Cemetery and the Demolished Cenotaph

The Fort Cemetery, where the officers who fell in the siege of Bangalore were buried, is illustrated in Robert Home's book, Select Views in Mysore, the country of Tippoo Sultan, published by Robert Bowyer, London, 1794. Home's painting shows the graves of Captains James Smith, James Williamson, John Shipper, Nathaniel Daws and Jeremiah Delany, Lieutenant Conan and Lieutenant-Colonel Gratton. As recorded in 1895, The cemetery was located just outside the Fort Church, with the church being responsible for its maintenance. The cemetery had cypress trees, rose bushes and flowers. The Government of Mysore, had constructed a wall and gate for the cemetery.

However, as recorded in 1912 by Rev. Frank Penny in his book The Church in Madras: Volume II, the cemetery no longer existed. The record of the offers who fell in the battle for the Bangalore Fort in 1791, were transferred to the cenotaph, raised by the Government of Mysore. The 35 feet tall cenotaph pillar was raised in memory of the lives lost in the siege of Bangalore, opposite to the present Corporation Building, and Hudson Memorial Church. Kannada activists led by Vatal Nagaraj and others made violent demands to demolish the cenotaph. As a result of these protests, the Bangalore City Corporation demolished the memorial on 28 October 1964, and the name of the road was also changed from Cenotaph Road to Nrupathunga Road. The engraved stones were destroyed, and not even a single stone remains. A small piece of the Cenotaph has been placed as a bench in the Corporation Office. Historians, and heritage lovers of Banaglore City are however enraged with this destruction of history. Well known blogger on Bangalore, Samyuktha Harshitha, calls it as 'official vandalism', comparing it with the destruction of the Bamiyan statues.

Sketches
The siege of Bangalore, resulted in a number of sketches by artists such as James Hunter, Thomas Daniell, William Daniell, Robert Home, etc. These sketches provide a detailed record of the landscape around the Bangalore Fort at that period.

Sketches of James Hunter
James Hunter served as a lieutenant in the Royal Artillery. He was a military painter, and his sketches portrayed aspects of military and everyday life. Hunter served the British India Army and took part in Tippu Sultan Campaigns.

Hunter has sketched different landscapes of South India, including Bangalore, Mysore, Hosur, Kancheepuram, Madras, Arcot, Sriperumbudur, etc. These paintings were published in 'A Brief history of ancient and modern India embellished with coloured engravings', published by Edward Orme, London between 1802–05, and 'Picturesque scenery in the Kingdom of Mysore' published by Edward Orme in 1804.

Hunter died in India in 1792. Some of his paintings of Bangalore Fort are below

Other British Sketches of Bangalore Fort

References

 Mill, James. A history of British India, Volume 5
 Miles, W (translator). The history of the Reign of Tipu Sultan

Bangalore
Bangalore 1791
Bangalore 1791
Bangalore 1791
History of Bangalore
1791 in India